{{DISPLAYTITLE:C13H19NOS}}
The molecular formula C13H19NOS (molar mass: 237.361 g/mol, exact mass: 237.1187 u) may refer to:

 α-Pyrrolidinopentiothiophenone
 SIB-1553A